A crew is a body or a class of people who work at a common activity, generally in a structured or hierarchical organization. A location in which a crew works is called a crewyard or a workyard. The word has nautical resonances: the tasks involved in operating a ship, particularly a sailing ship, providing numerous specialities within a ship's crew, often organised with a chain of command. Traditional nautical usage strongly distinguishes officers from crew, though the two groups combined form the ship's company. Members of a crew are often referred to by the title crewman or crew-member.

Crew also refers to the sport of rowing, where teams row competitively in racing shells.

See also
For a specific sporting usage, see rowing crew.
For filmmaking usage, see film crew.
For live music usage, see road crew.
For analogous entities in research on human judgment and decision-making, see team and judge–advisor system.
For stagecraft usage, see stage crew.
For video production usage, see television crew.
For the comic strip, see Motley's Crew.
For the sports team, see Columbus Crew SC.
For the 2014 video game, see The Crew.
For crews in aviation and the airline industry, see groundcrew and aircrew.
For crews in human spaceflight, see astronaut.
Tank crew
Boat crew

References

External links 

 Yacht Job Descriptions and Salary Guide

Social groups